Huracán is a Peruvian football club, playing in the city of Moquegua, Peru.

The club were founded 26 July 1958 and play in the Copa Perú which is the third division of the Peruvian league.

History
The club have played at the highest level of Peruvian football on six occasions, from 1985 Torneo Descentralizado until 1990 Torneo Descentralizado when was relegated.

Honours

Regional
Liga Departamental de Moquegua:
Winners (11): 1966, 1967, 1983,1984, 1994, 1995, 1996, 1997, 2005, 2010, 2011
 Runner-up (3): 2008, 2015, 2017

Liga Provincial de Mariscal Nieto:
Winners (6): 1967, 2003, 2009, 2010, 2015, 2016

Liga Distrital de Moquegua:
Winners (7): 1960, 1967, 2009, 2011, 2014, 2015, 2017
 Runner-up (1): 2010

See also
List of football clubs in Peru
Peruvian football league system

References 

Football clubs in Peru
Association football clubs established in 1958
1958 establishments in Peru